Linnaemya is a genus of flies in the family Tachinidae.

Species

L. altaica Richter, 1979
L. ambigua Shima, 1986
L. atriventris (Malloch, 1935)
L. claripalla Chao & Shi, 1980
L. comta (Fallén, 1810)
L. felis Mesnil, 1957
L. fissiglobula Pandellé, 1895
L. flavimedia Chao & Yuan, 1996
L. frater (Rondani, 1859)
L. haemorrhoidalis (Fallén, 1810)
L. helvetica Herting, 1963
L. hirtradia Chao & Shi, 1980
L. impudica (Rondani, 1859)
L. jaroschevskyi Zimin, 1954
L. kanoi Shima, 1986
L. lateralis (Townsend, 1927)
L. linguicerca Chao & Shi, 1980
L. lithosiophaga (Rondani, 1859)
L. majae Zimin, 1954
L. media Zimin, 1954
L. medogensis Chao & Zhou, 1998
L. microchaetopsis Shima, 1986
L. neavei Curran, 1934
L. olsufjevi Zimin, 1954
L. omega Zimin, 1954
L. paralongipalpis Chao, 1962
L. perinealis Pandellé, 1895
L. picta (Meigen, 1824)
L. pullior Shima, 1986
L. rossica Zimin, 1954
L. ruficornis Chao, 1962
L. scutellaris (Malloch, 1927)
L. setifrons Zimin, 1954
L. siamensis Shima, 1986
L. smirnovi Zimin, 1954
L. soror Zimin, 1954
L. steini Jacentkovsky, 1944
L. tessellans (Robineau-Desvoidy, 1830)
L. tuberocerca Chao & Shi, 1980
L. vulpina (Fallén, 1810)
L. vulpinoides (Baranov, 1932)
L. zachvatkini Zimin, 1954
L. zhangi Chao & Zhou, 1993

References

Tachininae
Commemoration of Carl Linnaeus
Diptera of Asia
Diptera of Europe
Diptera of North America
Tachinidae genera
Taxa named by Jean-Baptiste Robineau-Desvoidy